The Coso people are an indigenous people of the Americas and Native American tribe associated with the Coso Range in the Mojave Desert of California in the southwestern United States. They are of the Uto-Aztecan language and spoke one of several Numic languages, related to that of the Northern Paiute.

They are especially known for their ancient petroglyphs, or rock art drawings.  The Coso Rock Art District of California has been designated as a National Historic Landmark District.

History
Archaeological evidence substantiates trade between the Coso People and other Native American tribes. For example, they traded with the Chumash people, then located in present-day Ventura, Santa Barbara, and San Luis Obispo counties.  This was confirmed by archaeological recovery of a kind of obsidian, which has been chemically fingerprinted as belonging to the Coso culture and territory, but was discovered in coastal California prehistoric sites in San Luis Obispo County, California.

The Coso People are usually considered part of the Northern Paiute indigenous nation.

Petroglyphs
Notable rock art drawings, petroglyphs, are abundantly represented in Big and Little Petroglyph Canyons.  Such works have been found in the Coso Rock Art District, and throughout the Coso Region, dating from the prehistoric era.

In 1964, the Big and Little Petroglyph Canyons were declared a National Historic Landmark.  In 2001, they were incorporated into a larger National Historic Landmark District, called the Coso Rock Art District.

In 2014, an annual celebration was created in honor of the petroglyphs. The Ridgecrest Petroglyph Festival takes place in Ridgecrest, California, and was named one of the "10 Most Unique Autumn Festivals in the Country" by Groupon. The festival includes an intertribal powwow, street fair, and tours to the Big and Little Petroglyph Canyons.

See also
 Coso Hot Springs
 Coso Rock Art District
 Big and Little Petroglyph Canyons
 Rock art
 Petroglyph
 Paleo-Indians
 Paiute

Petroglyphs Tour Info
Note: only U.S. citizens are allowed on the tours, and advance reservation is required.  
Maturango Museum, 100 E. Las Flores Ave., Ridgecrest, CA 93555; (760) 375-6900, [http://www.maturango.org. 
Naval Air Weapons Station, (760) 939-1683.

Notes

References
 The Bradshaw Foundation, American Rock Art Archive, Alan P. Garfinkel. 2006. "Paradigm Shifts, Rock Art Studies, and the "Coso Sheep Cult" of Eastern California",North American Archaeologist 27(3):203-244 
 Alan P. Garfinkel. 2005. Archaeology and Rock Art of the Eastern Sierra and Great Basin Frontier, Maturango Museum, Ridgecrest, California
Alan P. Garfinkel. 2006. "Paradigm Shifts, Rock Art Studies, and the "Coso Sheep Cult" of Eastern California", North American Archaeologist 27(3):203-244 
Alan P.Garfinkel, Geron Marcom, and Robert A. Schiffman. 2006. "Culture Crisis and Rock Art Intensification: Numic Ghost Dance Paintings and Coso Representational Petroglyphs", American Indian Rock Art, Volume 33, Don Christensen and Peggy Whitehead, editors, p. 83-103. American Rock Art Research Association, Tucson, Arizona. 
 Campbell Grant, James W. Baird and J. Kenneth Pringle. 1968. Rock Drawings of the Coso Range, Inyo County, California: An Ancient Sheep-hunting Cult Pictured in Desert Rock Carvings, second edition, Maturango Press, 145 pages
 C. Michael Hogan. 2008. Morro Creek, ed. by A. Burnham 

Native American tribes in California
Paiute
Mojave Desert
Indigenous peoples of the Great Basin
Inyo County, California